Kerswell is a surname. Notable people with the surname include:

 Rich Kerswell (born 20th century), British fluid mechanics scientist 
 Sarah Kerswell (born 1965), British swimmer
 Henry Grant Kerswell (born 1978), British Opera Singer

Other uses
 Kerswell, East Devon, a small village in Broadhembury parish, Devon, England
 Kerswell Priory, near the village of Kerswell, Devon
 Kerswell Green, a village in Worcestershire, England
 Kings Kerswell, alternative (older) spelling of Kingskerswell, Devon